The 2005 Division 1 season was the 40th of the competition of the first-tier football in Senegal.  The tournament was organized by the Senegalese Football Federation.  The season began on 8 January and finished on 1 October.  ASC Port Autonome won the third and their recent title.  Port Autonome along with Diaraf would compete in the 2006 CAF Champions League the following season.  AS Douanes who won the 2005 Senegalese Cup participated in the 2006 CAF Confederation Cup, along with Compagnie sucrière sénégalaise.  The clubs that elevated into Division 1 would relegate do Division 2 as Renaissance sportive de Yoff was 17th and Mboro was 18th.

The season would feature 18 clubs. 306 matches were played and 519 goals were scored, fewer than last season, not a single club finished with a total of under 20 goals.  The following season would feature the group and playoff system where two groups would have nine clubs each, this would be used for the next few seasons.

ASC Diaraf was the defending team of the title.

Participating clubs

 Compagnie sucrière sénégalaise (Senegalese Sugar Company)
 ASC Port Autonome
 AS Douanes
 ASC Jeanne d'Arc
 ASC Saloum
 US Gorée
 Casa Sport
 ETICS Mboro
 Renaissance sportive de Yoff

 ASC HLM
 ASC Diaraf
 US Rail
 Dakar Université Club
 SONACOS
 ASEC Ndiambour
 Stade de Mbour
 US Ouakam
 Guédiawaye FC

Overview
The league was contested by 18 teams with ASC Port Autonome again winning the championship.

League standings

References

Senegal
Senegal Premier League seasons